A UK qualifying competition for the FAI Sailplane Grand Prix, a world gliding competition, has been held every second year since 2006.

Details and results

References

External links
Sailplane Grand Prix

Gliding competitions
Sports competitions in the United Kingdom
Gliding in the United Kingdom
2008 in air sports
2008 in British sport